2010 Vegalta Sendai season.

Competitions

Player statistics

Other pages
 J. League official site

Vegalta Sendai
Vegalta Sendai seasons